Radio ffn is a commercial radio station operated by Funk & Fernsehen Nordwestdeutschland GmbH & Co. KG in Lower Saxony, Germany. It broadcasts from regional studios in Braunschweig, Göttingen, Hanover (station HQ), Lüneburg, Oldenburg, and Osnabrück.

The station's managing director is Harald Gehrung and its program chief is Ina Tenz.

As well as transmitting on FM and satellite (DVB-S) ffn has since 2010 also been receivable via iPhone and iPad, with separate apps for each device.

Programmes and presenters 
Niedersachsens beste Morningshow ("Lower Saxony's best morning show")
Frank Schulte (alias Franky)
ffn am Vormittag ("ffn in the forenoon")
Julian Zumbrock
ffn am Nachmittag ("ffn in the afternoon")
Timm Busche
ffn am Abend ("ffn in the evening")
Marie Günther
Die Nacht in Niedersachsen ("The night in Lower Saxony")
Pure Music
Die Morningshow am Samstag ("The morning show on Saturday")
Malte Seidel

External links 

Homepage

Mass media in Hanover
Radio stations established in 1986
Radio stations in Germany